Henggart is a municipality in the district of Andelfingen in the canton of Zürich in Switzerland.

History
Henggart is first mentioned in 1228 as de Hengart.

Geography

Of this area, 56.5% is used for agricultural purposes, while 19.9% is forested. The rest of the land, (23.5%) is settled.

Demographics
, 7.9% of the population was made up of foreign nationals. Over the last 10 years the population has grown at a rate of 31.4%. Most of the population speaks German  (94.4%), with Albanian being second most common ( 1.5%) and Italian being third ( 1.0%).

In the 2007 election the most popular party was the SVP which received 45.8% of the vote.  The next three most popular parties were the SPS (14.3%), the FDP (11.5%) and the CSP (11.4%).

The age distribution of the population is children and teenagers (0–19 years old) make up 26.3% of the population, while adults (20–64 years old) make up 61.9% and seniors (over 64 years old) make up 11.8%. In Henggart about 85.6% of the population (between age 25-64) have completed either non-mandatory upper secondary education or additional higher education (either university or a Fachhochschule).

Henggart has an unemployment rate of 1.57%.  , there were 35 people employed in the primary economic sector and about 14 businesses involved in this sector.  67 people are employed in the secondary sector and there are 14 businesses in this sector.  248 people are employed in the tertiary sector, with 48 businesses in this sector.
The historical population is given in the following table:

Transportation 
Henggart railway station is a stop of the S-Bahn Zürich on the line S33.

References

External links 

 Official website 
 

Municipalities of the canton of Zürich